Sievero-Hundorivskyi is an urban-type settlement in Krasnodon Municipality in Dovzhansk Raion of Luhansk Oblast in eastern Ukraine. Population:

Demographics
Native language distribution as of the Ukrainian Census of 2001:
 Ukrainian: 6.02%
 Russian: 93.38%

References

Urban-type settlements in Dovzhansk Raion